James Agar (10 July 1781 – 6 September 1866) was a 19th-century Anglican priest in Ireland.

The son of Charles Agar, 1st Earl of Normanton, Archbishop of Dublin from 1801 until 1809, he was educated at Westminster School and Christ Church, Oxford.  He was Archdeacon of Kilmore from 1810 to 1866

References

19th-century Irish Anglican priests
Archdeacons of Kilmore
Alumni of Trinity College Dublin
1866 deaths
1781 births